Scleroderma cepa is an ectomycorrhizal fungus used as a soil inoculant in agriculture and horticulture. It is poisonous.

References 

Boletales
Fungi described in 1801
Poisonous fungi
Taxa named by Christiaan Hendrik Persoon